B Sides Win: Extras, Bonus Tracks and B-Sides 1992-2008 is a compilation album by Sloan, comprising B-sides, bonus tracks and compilation tracks recorded between 1992 and 2008. The album was released in February 2010 on Sloan's Murderecords label, in a digital download format.

Track listing

References 

2010 albums
Sloan (band) albums